Bluford Wilson (November 30, 1841 – July 15, 1924) was a Union Army officer in the Civil War and a government official who served as Solicitor of the United States Treasury.

Early life
Bluford Wilson was born near Shawneetown, Illinois on November 30, 1841. He studied at McKendree College and the University of Michigan Law School before enlisting for the American Civil War.

Military career
Wilson joined the 120th Illinois Volunteer Infantry. He soon received an officer's commission and appointment as regimental adjutant. He later served on several other staffs, including that of the XIII Corps, taking part in numerous battles and campaigns, including Champion Hill, Black River and the Siege of Vicksburg, and the Red River Campaign. He was discharged with the rank of major at the end of the war.

For the rest of his life Wilson was active in the Grand Army of the Republic and the Military Order of the Loyal Legion of the United States.

Legal career
Wilson resumed studying law at the University of Michigan Law School, graduated in 1866, and was admitted to the bar in 1867.

A Republican, Wilson was appointed United States Attorney for the Southern District of Illinois in 1869.

In 1874 Wilson received appointment as Solicitor of the Treasury, which he held until 1876.

Wilson's rise through the ranks of federal appointed office were based in part on his family's relationship with President Ulysses S. Grant. Bluford Wilson's brother Major General James H. Wilson served on Grant's staff and as one of Grant's subordinate commanders during the Civil War.

As Solicitor Wilson played a key role in exposing the Whiskey Ring.  He conducted an investigation into the frauds, reported his findings to his superiors, and attempted through his brother James to warn President Grant.  When Grant moved to protect members of his administration and prevent prosecutions, Wilson resigned.

Later life
After leaving government service Wilson settled in Springfield, Illinois, where he practiced law and became involved in the construction and management of several railroads.

During the Spanish–American War Wilson offered his services; the governor authorized him to raise a regiment and he was commissioned a Colonel in the Illinois militia, but the war ended before his regiment could see active service.

Death and burial
Wilson died in Springfield on July 15, 1924. He was buried at Oak Ridge Cemetery in Springfield.

Family
In 1865 Wilson married Alice Warren Mather of Louisville, Kentucky, and they were the parents of five children. Harry died in infancy. Jessie was the wife of Phillip Barton Warren. Lucy was the wife of Ralph Vance Dickerman. Bluford died during his senior year at Yale University. Arthur graduated from West Point in 1904, attained the rank of Colonel during a career that spanned the years 1904 to 1942, and received the Medal of Honor during the Philippine Insurrection.

References

1841 births
1924 deaths
People from Springfield, Illinois
McKendree University alumni
University of Michigan Law School alumni
Illinois lawyers
People of Illinois in the American Civil War
United States Department of the Treasury officials
Union Army officers
Burials at Oak Ridge Cemetery
People from Shawneetown, Illinois
Illinois Republicans
Anti-crime activists
19th-century American lawyers